Aulonemia longipedicellata is a species of Aulonemia bamboo.
It is part of the grass family and endemic to Latin America.

References

longipedicellata